George Bruce (born 1942) was the Bishop of Ontario from 2002 until 2011.

Born in 1942 in Ely, Cambridgeshire, England, his family emigrated to the United States in 1953. From 1959 until 1986 he served in the Canadian Forces. He holds a degree from the  Royal Military College of Canada, Kingston and was ordained the following year. He began his second career with a curacy  at St Matthew Ottawa  before being appointed Rector of Winchester, Ontario and then  St. James the Apostle, Perth, Ontario. In 2000 he became Dean of St George's Cathedral before being appointed Bishop of the Diocese two years alter. A reflective man, Bruce is married with five children.

In 2007, Bruce was referenced in The Globe and Mail, a national newspaper in Canada, for refusing to investigate an ex-student's plea to investigate abuse that she and others suffered at Grenville Christian College in the Anglican Diocese of Ontario. 
  The Globe and Mail later confirmed that Bruce had launched an investigation, which was stopped when a criminal investigation was begun.

Notes 

1942 births
Living people
Anglican bishops of Ontario
Canadian Anglican priests
English emigrants to the United States
People from Ely, Cambridgeshire
Royal Military College of Canada alumni